La Vallée, also known as Obscured by Clouds, is a 1972 French film written and directed by Barbet Schroeder. The film stars Bulle Ogier as Viviane, a woman who goes on a strange and accidental voyage of self-discovery through the New Guinea bush.

Pink Floyd recorded an album, Obscured by Clouds, as the soundtrack to the film. After recording had finished, the band fell out with the film company, prompting them to release the soundtrack album as Obscured by Clouds, rather than La Vallée. In response, the film was retitled La Vallée (Obscured by Clouds) on its release.

The actress credit "Monique Giraudy" is actually an alias of Miquette Giraudy, at the time a film editor and, later on, vocalist and synthesizer player with the progressive rock/space rock band Gong with her partner Steve Hillage; they later formed the electronic group System 7.

Plot
Viviane (Ogier), the wife of the French consul in Melbourne, joins a group of explorers in search of a mysterious hidden valley in the bush of New Guinea, where she hopes to find the feathers of an extremely rare exotic bird. Along the way through the dense jungles of Papua New Guinea and on the peak of Mount Giluwe, she and the small group of explorers make contact with the Mapuga tribe, one of the most isolated groups of human beings on earth, who inspire them to explore their own humanity, unfettered by their own subjective ideas of "civilization". The search becomes a search for a paradise said to exist within a valley marked as "obscured by cloud" on the only map of the area available dated as surveyed in 1969.

Cast
Bulle Ogier as Viviane
Jean-Pierre Kalfon as Gaëtan
Valérie Lagrange as Hermine
Michael Gothard as Olivier
Jérôme Beauvarlet as Yann
Miquette Giraudy (credited as Monique Giraudy) as Monique
Thomas Binns Associate Producer and actor (as foul mouthed Australian)
The Mapuga tribe and its Chiefs

References

External links

1972 drama films
1972 films
French adventure drama films
1970s French-language films
Films directed by Barbet Schroeder
Films set in Papua New Guinea
Films shot in Papua New Guinea
Films with screenplays by Paul Gégauff
1970s French films
Films scored by Pink Floyd